Kotrike Madhusudan Gupta is an Indian politician who was the 2009 Congress MLA from Guntakal for the Andhra Pradesh Legislative Assembly. He was once a member of the Indian National Congress, and now contesting as Guntakal MLA for the 2019 Andhra Pradesh Legislative Assembly election from Jana Sena Party.

References

Living people
Members of the Andhra Pradesh Legislative Assembly
People from Anantapur district
Jana Sena Party politicians
1968 births
Indian National Congress politicians from Andhra Pradesh